Now o Now I Needs Must Part was written by the sixteenth-seventeenth-century composer John Dowland. A bittersweet contemplation of love and loss, it was first published in Dowland's book called First Booke of Songes or Ayres of foure partes with Tableture for the Lute (1597).

Lyrics
Now, O now, I needs must part,
Parting though I absent mourn.
Absence can no joy impart:
Joy once fled cannot return.
While I live I needs must love,
Love lives not when Hope is gone.
Now at last Despair doth prove,
Love divided loveth none.

Sad despair doth drive me hence,
This despair unkindness sends.
If that parting be offence,
It is she which then offends.

Dear, when I am from thee gone,
Gone are all my joys at once.
I loved thee and thee alone,
In whose love I joyed once.
And although your sight I leave,
Sight wherein my joys do lie,
Till that death do sense bereave,
Never shall affection die.

Dear if I do not return
Love and I shall die together,
For my absence never mourn,
Whom you might have joyed ever.
Part we must, though now I die.
Die I do to part with you.
Him despair doth cause to lie,
Who both lived and died true.

External links

http://www.thehypertexts.com/John%20Dowland%20Poet%20Poetry%20Picture%20Bio.htm

English songs
16th-century songs